Zagir Garipovich Ismagilov (January 8, 1917 — May 30, 2003) was a Soviet Bashkir composer and pedagogue. He was granted the title People's Artist of the USSR in 1982, and was a member of the Communist Party of the Soviet Union since 1943. The performing arts center in Ufa, Russia is named after him. The first rector and founder of the Ufa Institute of arts (1968–1988) (associate Professor since 1973, Professor since 1977).

Biography
The son of a woodcutter, the composer was born January 8, 1917, in the village of Sermenevo. Zagir had three brothers and a sister, who died in 1921 of typhoid fever. 

Ismagilov studied in the Bashkir seven-year school in the village of Nijne-Sermenevo. From the beginning of his studies, the future composer was interested in the native folk music of the Bashkir people, and learned to play the quray. In 1932 he went to study at the Inzer wood-chemical school. He graduated early and began working in Beloretsk lespromhoz appraiser. In 1935, Arslan Mubaryakov invited him to take part in the Bashkir Academic Drama Theatre, Ufa, where he played in the evenings as a quray player (musician). During the days he studied at the music studio, which opened in Ufa (1936). In 1937, Ismagilov went to study at the Bashkir studio of the Moscow Conservatory.

During World War II he worked in Ufa, was part of concerts given for front-line troops, and composed patriotic songs. After the war, he finished training in the studio in 1948, then became part of the music composition faculty at the Moscow Conservatory.

Ismagilov became chairman of the Union of Composers of the Bashkir Republic in 1958. And in 1968 he was the founder and first rector of the UFA Institute of Arts, where he remained until 1988. He was a deputy of the Supreme Soviet of Bashkortostan for many years, and was eventually elected its chairman.

The composer's works were performed in Russia, the republics of the former National Union (now CIS) and internationally (Bulgaria, China, Romania, North Korea, Yugoslavia, and Ethiopia). Additionally, they were published and recorded by the record production company, "Melodiya", and are available in the stock records of Bashkir radio and TV.

Zagir Ismagilov contributed to the development of national opera, chamber vocal, choral and instrumental music in the Soviet Union. His work expresses the ideological themes of working in harmony, friendship and love, and reflects the civil-patriotic, national creative ideal. The composer developed the tradition of classical Russian music culture, their history and musical-dramatic concepts. Ismagilov's work has had a national historic theme, with strong influence from his Bashkir heritage. His opera Salawat Yulayev tells the story of a national hero, while the epic opera The Ambassadors of the Urals, about accession of Bashkirs to Russia, and Kahym-Turea tells the story of a military commander who led the Bashkirs against Napoleon in 1812. The opera Akmulla is based on the life of the Bashkir poet and educator of the 19th century. Ismagilov's works ranges from operas like Shaura and Waves Agideli, to musical comedies such as Codasa and Almakay.

The first rector and founder of the Ufa Institute of arts (1968–1988) (associate Professor since 1973, Professor since 1977).

After a long illness, he died in 2003.

Awards
Salawat Yulayev Award
Order of Lenin
Order of the Red Banner of Labour
Order of the Badge of Honour
Order of Friendship of Peoples

Composer's works 

Salawat Yulayev
Shaura (Opera)
Ambassadors of the Urals (Opera)
Kahym- Turya (Opera)
Agidel Waves (Opera)
Kodasa (musical Comedy)
Almakay (musical Comedy)
Singrau torna (The crane song) (Ballet)
About 300 songs and romances

References 

1917 births
2003 deaths
Communist Party of the Soviet Union members
Moscow Conservatory alumni
People's Artists of the RSFSR
People's Artists of the USSR
Glinka State Prize of the RSFSR winners
Recipients of the Order "For Merit to the Fatherland", 4th class
Recipients of the Order of Friendship of Peoples
Recipients of the Order of Lenin
Recipients of the Order of the Red Banner of Labour
Bashkir people
Male opera composers
Male operetta composers
Russian ballet composers
Russian male classical composers
Russian male composers
Russian music educators
Russian opera composers
Soviet male classical composers
Soviet male composers
Soviet music educators
Soviet opera composers